Kalinovo is a rural locality (a village) in Borovetskoye Rural Settlement, Sokolsky District, Vologda Oblast, Russia. The population was 17 as of 2002.

Geography 
Kalinovo is located 18 km northwest of Sokol (the district's administrative centre) by road. Ofimkino is the nearest rural locality.

References 

Rural localities in Sokolsky District, Vologda Oblast